Thomas McCreery Powers (July 7, 1890 – November 9, 1955) was an American actor in theatre, films, radio and television. A veteran of the Broadway stage, notably in plays by George Bernard Shaw, he created the role of Charles Marsden in Eugene O'Neill's Strange Interlude. He succeeded Orson Welles in the role of Brutus in the Mercury Theatre's debut production, Caesar. In films, he was a star of Vitagraph Pictures and later became best known for his role as the victim of scheming wife Barbara Stanwyck and crooked insurance salesman Fred MacMurray in the film noir classic, Double Indemnity (1944).

Career 

Thomas McCreery Powers was born in 1890 in Owensboro, Kentucky. His father, Colonel Joshua D. Powers, was a banker; his uncle was sculptor Hiram Powers. Tom Powers' mother loved the theatre and enrolled him at ballet school at age three. He entered the American Academy of Dramatic Arts at age 16, and he studied drama, wrote and produced plays, and practiced stage design in a small theatre in the attic of his home. Powers apprenticed to a pantomime troupe for ten years and became a star of Vitagraph Westerns. Powers appeared in over 70 silent films from 1911 to 1917 opposite such actors as Florence Turner, Harry T. Morey, Clara Kimball Young, Alma Taylor and John Bunny.

Powers had great success in his first Broadway appearance, as William Booth in Mr. Lazarus (1916). He became a star in musical comedies, and won acclaim as a leading player and character actor. His best-known roles included Gregers Werle in The Wild Duck, the captain in Androcles and the Lion, and Bluntschli in Arms and the Man — all in 1925 — and King Magnus in The Apple Cart (1930). He created the role of Charles Marsden in Eugene O'Neill's long-running drama, Strange Interlude (1928–29). In 1938 he succeeded Orson Welles as Brutus in the Mercury Theatre's debut stage production, Caesar, and in 1941 he toured nationwide in The Man Who Came to Dinner. His last significant Broadway role was in Three Sisters (1942), with Judith Anderson, Katharine Cornell and Ruth Gordon.

His radio credits include Tom Powers' Life Studies (1935–36), a 15-minute series consisting of true-life stories broadcast on NBC. Powers published two books of monologues, Life Studies (1939) and More Life Studies (1940). He also wrote four plays and two romantic novels, Virgin with Butterflies (1945) and Sheba on Trampled Grass (1946).

Powers moved to the West Coast after becoming ill with arthritis, and became a full-time movie actor when Billy Wilder invited him to play the murder victim in the 1944 film noir classic, Double Indemnity. For the next dozen years or so, Powers appeared in over 80 film and television roles, usually playing middle-aged business men, military or police officers. His performance as Metallus Cimber in Julius Caesar (1953) is regarded as Powers' best during his Hollywood years.

Personal life
Tom Powers was married to Meta Murray Janney of Philadelphia on September 7, 1929. Powers died of heart disease at his home in Manhattan Beach, California, on November 9, 1955, at age 65. He was interred in Pierce Brothers Valhalla Memorial Park, in North Hollywood, California.

Partial filmography

 A Window on Washington Park (1913) - The young millionaire
Barnaby Rudge (1915) - Barnaby Rudge
As Ye Repent (1915) - Harry Somers
The Auction Block (1917) - Bob Wharton
Double Indemnity (1944) - Mr. Dietrichson
Practically Yours (1944) - Commander Harry Harpe
The Phantom Speaks (1945) - Harvey Bogardus
The Chicago Kid (1945) - Mike Thurber
Two Years Before the Mast (1946) - Bellamer
The Blue Dahlia (1946) - Capt. Hendrickson
Her Adventurous Night (1946) - Dan Carter
The Last Crooked Mile (1946) - Floyd Sorelson
Angel and the Badman (1947) - Dr. Mangram
The Farmer's Daughter (1947) - Hy Nordick
For the Love of Rusty (1947) - Hugh Mitchell
They Won't Believe Me (1947) - Trenton
 The Son of Rusty (1947) - Hugh Mitchell
I Love Trouble (1948) - Ralph Johnston
Up in Central Park (1948) - Rogan
The Time of Your Life (1948) - Freddy Blick (a stool pigeon and frame-up artist)
The Velvet Touch (1948) - Detective (uncredited)
Station West (1948) - Capt. Iles
Angel in Exile (1948) - Warden
Mexican Hayride (1948) - Ed Mason
Special Agent (1949) - Chief Special Agent Wilcox
Scene of the Crime (1949) - Umpire Menafoe
Chicago Deadline (1949) - Glenn Howard
Chinatown at Midnight (1949) - Capt. Howard Brown
East Side, West Side (1949) - Owen Lee
The Nevadan (1950) - Bill Martin
Destination Moon (1950) - General Thayer
Right Cross (1950) - Tom Balford
Again Pioneers (1950) - Ken Keeler
Fighting Coast Guard (1951) - Admiral Ryan
The Strip (1951) - Detective Lt. Bonnabel
The Tall Target (1951) - Simon G. Stroud (uncredited)
The Well (1951) - Mayor
Phone Call from a Stranger (1952) - Dr. Fernwood (uncredited)
Flesh and Fury (1952) - Andy Randolph
Deadline – U.S.A. (1952) - Andrew Wharton (uncredited)
The Fabulous Senorita (1952) - Delaney
Jet Job (1952) - Oscar Collins
Denver and Rio Grande (1952) - Sloan
Bal Tabarin (1952) - Eddie Mendies
Diplomatic Courier (1952) - Cherney (uncredited)
We're Not Married! (1952) - Atty. Gen. Frank Bush (uncredited)
The WAC from Walla Walla (1952) - General (uncredited)
Horizons West (1952) - Frank Tarleton
The Steel Trap (1952) - Valcourt, Travel Agent
The Marksman (1953) - Lt. Governor Watson
Scared Stiff (1953) - Police Lieutenant (uncredited)
Julius Caesar (1953) - Metellus Cimber
Hannah Lee (1953) - Sheriff
The Last Posse (1953) - Frank White
Devil's Canyon (1953) - Joe Holbert (uncredited)
I, the Jury (1953) - Milt Miller
Donovan's Brain (1953) - Donovan's Washington Advisor
Sea of Lost Ships (1953) - Rear Admiral
Lucky Me (1954) - Thayer Crony (uncredited)
The Mad Magician (1954) - Inspector (uncredited)
The Americano (1955) - Jim Rogers
Ten Wanted Men (1955) - Henry Green
New York Confidential (1955) - District Attorney Rossi
The Eternal Sea (1955) - General (uncredited)
Double Jeopardy (1955) - Harry Sheldon
 The Go-Getter (1956) - Miller's Business Partner

References

External links 

1890 births
1955 deaths
American male stage actors
American male film actors
American male silent film actors
American male television actors
20th-century American male actors